Orange Regional Airport  is located in the Central Tablelands region of New South Wales between the city of Orange and the town of Blayney.

Facilities
In April 1976, it became the first airport in Australia to have a pilot-controlled lighting system installed.

Terminal upgrade and airport extension
As part of a larger upgrade to the airport, the old terminal building was closed on 21 September 2013 and demolished in the following weeks. Construction of the new terminal was estimated to cost A$3.3 million. A two-year project to extend the airport's main runway by  commenced around the same time, and was completed in 2015.

In August 2014, the airport's new terminal opened, which featured dedicated departures and arrivals areas; room for facilities for three airlines; a cafe and a conveyor belt system. Additionally, the terminal has secured long term car parking (which is currently free), free unsecured long term parking, and short term/drop off parking. The terminal has no security screening, meaning that despite the improvements to the airport's runways, aircraft with over 50 seats remain unable to offer services from the airport.

Airlines and destinations

Other airport users

Orange Aero Club
Originally established in the 1930s, the Orange Aero Club is a social and flying club based at the airport. The club hosts regular flying competitions and fly-aways from its new building, the Max Hazelton Aero Centre, named after the founder of Hazelton Airlines.

Flight training
There are a small number of flying schools based at the airport accommodating training in both fixed-wing and rotary-wing aircraft.

Statistics
Orange Airport was ranked 53rd in Australia for the number of revenue passengers served in financial year 2010–2011.

See also
List of airports in New South Wales

References

External links

 
 Map of the proposed Orange Airport upgrade

Airports in New South Wales
City of Orange